The 26th Legislative Assembly of Ontario was in session from June 11, 1959, until August 16, 1963, just prior to the 1963 general election. The majority party was the Ontario Progressive Conservative Party led by Leslie Frost.

John Robarts replaced Frost as Progressive Conservative Party leader and Premier in November 1961.

William Murdoch served as speaker for the assembly.

References 
Members in Parliament 26 

Terms of the Legislative Assembly of Ontario
1959 establishments in Ontario
1963 disestablishments in Ontario